Bathumi is a town located in the Shire of Moira local government area. The Ski-Land Motel is in Bathumi and is located on the corner of Boomahnoomoonah Road and the Murray Valley Highway. It has a range of activities including fishing, table-tennis and many more activities.

References

Towns in Victoria (Australia)
Shire of Moira